KRI Diponegoro (365) is a Diponegoro-class corvette of the Indonesian Navy.

Development 

The Diponegoro-class guided-missile corvettes of the Indonesian Navy are SIGMA 9113 types of the Netherlands-designed Sigma family of modular naval vessels, named after Indonesian Prince Diponegoro. Currently there are 4 Diponegoro-class corvette in service.

Construction and career 
Diponegoro was laid down on 24 March 2005 and launched on 16 September 2006 by Damen Group, Vlissingen. She was commissioned on 5 July 2007 by Admiral Slamet Soebijanto, Indonesian Navy Chief of Staff.

Gallery

References

2006 ships
Diponegoro-class corvettes